The 21801 / 02 Jhansi–Indore Link Express is an Express train of the Express/Mail series belonging to Indian Railways – North Central Railway zone that runs between  and  in India.

It operates as train number 21801 from Jhansi Junction to Indore Junction and as train number 21802 in the reverse direction, serving the states of  Madhya Pradesh & Uttar Pradesh.

Coaches

The 21801 / 02 Jhansi–Indore Link Express' has 1 AC 3 tier, 2 Sleeper class & 2 end-on generator coaches. It doesn't carry a pantry car.

As is customary with most train services in India, coach composition may be amended at the discretion of Indian Railways depending on demand.

Service

As the average speed of the train is below , as per Indian Railways rules, its fare doesn't includes a Superfast surcharge.

Routing

Traction

It also shares its rakes with 11125 / 11126 Indore–Gwalior Intercity Express & 11801 / 11802 Jhansi–Etawah Link Express

References

External links
 21801 Jhansi–Indore Link Express at India Rail Info
21802 Indore–Jhansi Link Express at India Rail Info

Express trains in India
Rail transport in Madhya Pradesh
Trains from Jhansi
Transport in Indore